Mohamed El-Kemissi (born 2 March 1931) is a former Tunisian cyclist. He competed in the individual road race and team time trial events at the 1960 Summer Olympics.

References

External links
 

1931 births
Possibly living people
Tunisian male cyclists
Olympic cyclists of Tunisia
Cyclists at the 1960 Summer Olympics
People from Jendouba Governorate
20th-century Tunisian people